82nd NYFCC Awards
January 3, 2017

Best Picture: 
La La Land

The 82nd New York Film Critics Circle Awards, honoring the best in film for 2016, were announced on December 1, 2016 and presented on January 3, 2017.

Winners

Best Film:
La La Land
Best Director:
Barry Jenkins – Moonlight
Best Actor:
Casey Affleck – Manchester by the Sea
Best Actress:
Isabelle Huppert – Elle and Things to Come
Best Supporting Actor:
Mahershala Ali – Moonlight
Best Supporting Actress:
Michelle Williams – Certain Women and Manchester by the Sea
Best Screenplay:
Kenneth Lonergan – Manchester by the Sea
Best Animated Film:
Zootopia
Best Cinematography:
James Laxton – Moonlight
Best Non-Fiction Film:
O.J.: Made in America
Best Foreign Language Film:
Toni Erdmann • Germany
Best First Film:
Kelly Fremon Craig – The Edge of Seventeen (TIE)
Trey Edward Shults – Krisha (TIE)
Special Award:
Julie Dash and Thelma Schoonmaker

References

External links
 2016 Awards

New York Film Critics Circle Awards
New York
2016 in American cinema
New
2016 in New York City